The 1999 LPGA Tour was the 50th season since the LPGA Tour officially began in 1950. The season ran from January 15 to November 14. The season consisted of 38 official money events. Karrie Webb won the most tournaments, six. She also led the money list with earnings of $1,591,959.

The season saw the first tournament with a winner's share of over $300,000, the U.S. Women's Open. There were seven first-time winners in 1999: Akiko Fukushima, Jackie Gallagher-Smith, Maria Hjorth, Mi Hyun Kim, Kelli Kuehne, Mardi Lunn, and Catrin Nilsmark.

The Jamie Farr Kroger Classic saw the first ever six-way playoff in LPGA Tour history. It was won by Se Ri Pak.

The tournament results and award winners are listed below.

Tournament results
The following table shows all the official money events for the 1999 season. "Date" is the ending date of the tournament. The numbers in parentheses after the winners' names are the number of wins they had on the tour up to and including that event. Majors are shown in bold.

^ – weather-shortened tournament

Awards

References

External links
LPGA Tour official site
1999 season coverage at golfobserver.com

LPGA Tour seasons
LPGA Tour